Fintan's Grave is a mythological cave on the Irish mountain (now hill) Tul Tuinde (Hill of the Wave) in the Arra Mountains near Lough Derg.

Supposedly, Fintan mac Bóchra waited out the Flood here.

References

External links
MountainViews: Info on Tountinna Tonn Toinne (457m) in area Shannon

Caves of the Republic of Ireland
Irish mythology
Mythological cycle